Betrayed Women is a 1955 American crime film directed by Edward L. Cahn and written by Steve Fisher. The film stars Carole Mathews, Beverly Michaels, Peggy Knudsen, Tom Drake, Sara Haden, John Dierkes and Esther Dale. The film was released on July 17, 1955, by Allied Artists Pictures.

Plot

Cast          
Carole Mathews as Kate Morrison
Beverly Michaels as Honey Blake
Peggy Knudsen as Nora Collins
Tom Drake as Jeff Darrow
Sara Haden as Darcy
John Dierkes as Cletus Ballard
Esther Dale as Mrs. Ballard
Paul Savage as Baby Face
Darlene Fields as Mrs. Mabry
John Damler as Joe Mabry
G. Pat Collins as Hostage Guard
Burt Wenland as Guard
Pete Kellett as Guard

References

External links
 

1955 films
1950s English-language films
American crime films
1955 crime films
Allied Artists films
Films directed by Edward L. Cahn
Films set in prison
Women in prison films
1950s prison films
1950s American films
American black-and-white films